Boeing Business Jets (BBJ) are versions of Boeing's jet airliners with modifications to serve the private, head of state and corporate jet market. In 1996, Phil Condit, president of The Boeing Company, and Jack Welch, chairman and CEO of General Electric, sketched out their ideal business jet– a high-performance derivative of the 737 Next Generation, capable of flying more than 6,000 nautical miles nonstop and offering more cabin space than traditional long-range business jets. The first BBJ, based on the 737-700, rolled out on July 26, 1998 and had its first flight Sept. 4, 1998.

Boeing expanded the BBJ brand to include configurations based on the 737 MAX, 777, 777X, 787 Dreamliner and 747-8 Intercontinental, which are known as BBJ 737 MAX, BBJ 777, BBJ 777X, BBJ 787, and BBJ 747-8, respectively. Boeing currently produces the BBJ 737-7, BBJ 737-8, BBJ 737-9, BBJ 787-8, and BBJ 787-9. The BBJ 777X will be available once it is certified by the FAA.

Sought by VVIP customers and heads of state alike, BBJs are uniquely customized for each owner: private, business or government. Since its introduction as a separate group, Boeing Business Jets has delivered over 250 airplanes on more than 260 orders.

BBJs typically seat between 19 and 50 passengers with bespoke configurations that often include master bedrooms, washrooms with full-sized showers, conference and dining areas, living areas, a fitness center and more. All models of BBJs are delivered by Boeing in a "green" condition, meaning there are no interior furnishings so that the owner can design it to personal preference.

After the launch of the BBJ, Airbus followed suit with the launch of the Airbus ACJ derived from its A319 airliner, then the larger A320 and the smaller A318 Elite. Other smaller competitors include the Embraer Lineage, the Bombardier Global Express, the Gulfstream G550 and the Gulfstream G650.

Models

Current production models

Narrow body 

The primary product offered by Boeing Business Jets is the BBJ 737 MAX family. Launch was announced on April 2, 2014 and first delivery occurred on October 15, 2018. The BBJ MAX replaces and improves upon the original BBJ 737 family. It features lower cabin altitude for enhanced passenger comfort, new CFM LEAP-1B engines, improved aerodynamics, and advanced systems to deliver a 15% reduction in fuel consumption with increased range over the original BBJ family. 

The BBJ MAX is based upon the Boeing 737 MAX family of aircraft. Unlike most commercial 737s, the BBJ MAX has integrated airstairs to allow independent operations at remote airfields. BBJ MAX aircraft also come with equipped with all of the optional systems and features available on the commercial 737, as well as the highest takeoff weight and maximum engine thrust. Another key difference is the installation of auxiliary fuel tanks in the cargo compartment to achieve ranges in excess of 6,000 nmi (11,110 km), and a low cabin altitude system. The latter maintains a maximum cabin altitude of 6,500 even at the maximum cruise altitude of 41,000 ft, to improve passenger comfort and well-being.

The BBJ MAX benefits from its commercial roots. Direct operating costs are estimated at $5,200 to $5,600 per hour – significantly lower than purpose-built business jets. This efficiency is partly enabled by a low utilization maintenance program (known as LUMP), which stretches out the maintenance intervals for BBJ operators – major checks occurring every 4 years, and heavy checks only once every 12 years.
 BBJ 737-7 (BBJ MAX 7) is a variant of Boeing 737 MAX 7. It is 6 ft 4 in (1.93m) longer than the original BBJ1 and features a range of 6,600 nmi (12,225 km), which is 445 nmi (825 km) further than the BBJ1. The 737-7 is currently undergoing certification.  
 BBJ 737-8 (BBJ MAX 8) is a variant of the Boeing 737 MAX 8. It first flew on April 16, 2018, and was first delivered in October of that year. The middle member of the family, it offers a strong combination of size and range.
 BBJ 737-9 (BBJ MAX 9) is a variant of the Boeing 737 MAX 9 and is the largest member of the BBJ MAX family, offering a cabin floor area of 1,120 sq ft (104.1 m2). The first BBJ 737-9 was delivered green on August 18, 2021.
In 2021, the equipped price of the BBJ MAX 7 was $98.3M, $107.3M for the MAX 8 and $115.2M for the MAX 9.

Specifications

Wide Body 
Based on Boeing's commercial 787 Dreamliner, the BBJ 787 is a successful business jet featuring a composite airframe and low cabin altitude system.  It is partnered with the largest passenger and business aviation aircraft currently produced, the 777X. The BBJ 777X was announced on Dec. 10, 2018, and it will have the capability to fly more than halfway around the world without stopping, farther than any business jet ever built.

BBJ 787 Family: Based on the successful Boeing 787 Dreamliner family, the BBJ 787−8 and the BBJ 787-9 are long range aircraft, with ranges of 9,960 and 9,475 nmi (18,445 and 17,550 km), respectively, with 25 passengers. Eighteen were ordered through September 2022 with 16 delivered. 

BBJ 777X Family: Boeing launched BBJ variants of the 777X at the Middle East Business Aviation Association Show in December 2018. The BBJ 777-8 and 777-9 will have ranges of 11,835 and 11,330 nmi (21,920 and 20,985 km), respectively, with 25 passengers. Now the largest business jets in the world, these aircraft have cabin areas of 3,256 and 3,689 sq. ft. (302.5 and 342.7 sq m) cabin. The cabin area of the 777-9 is larger than the main deck of a 747-400, and will be 30% cheaper to operate per hour. The 777X is currently undergoing certification before entry-into-service.

Specifications

Out-of-production models 
Narrow-body
The first BBJ (often referred to as “BBJ” or “BBJ1”) was based on the 737-700 with a stronger wing and landing gear from the 737-800. It offered up to nine auxiliary belly fuel tanks to extend the aircraft's range to over 6,000 nautical miles (11,000 km). Aviation Partners winglets became standard on the BBJ, giving it a 5% range boost.

In 2002, the BBJ2, based on the 737-800, was introduced, offering a 25% longer cabin with a similar range with five tanks. In 2009, the BBJ3 was introduced based on the even longer 737-900.

During its 20 years of production, 150 BBJs entered service, triple the initial forecast of 50. Boeing delivered the last BBJ based on the 737NG in 2021.

 BBJ (retroactively referred to as the BBJ1) was based on the 737-700, and formed the basis for the 737-700ER. This was the initial, and most popular variant.
 BBJ2 was based on the 737-800.
 BBJ3 was based on the 737-900ER.
 BBJ C was based on the 737-700C. This aircraft features the ability to "quick change" between a configuration for VIP passengers and for cargo. In United States Navy service, this is known as the C-40A Clipper.

Wide-body

Boeing previously offered BBJs based on the 747-8 Intercontinental, the final model of the venerable 747 family, and BBJs based on the 777 aircraft. 

 BBJ 747: The 2nd largest business jet ever produced, it offered over 4,700 sq ft (440 m2) of cabin area, across the main and upper decks. It had a range of 8,875 nmi (16,436 km) with 100 passengers, 17 were ordered through September 2022, all delivered. 
 BBJ 777: The BBJ 777-200LR and BBJ 777-300ER, based on the commercial 777s of those variants, were offered prior to the introduction of the BBJ 777X family. They offered ranges of 10,030 and 9,300 nmi (18,580 and 17,220 km) with 75 passengers, respectively. Seventeen were ordered, and all have been delivered.

Operators

Private
BBJs were initially operated by Fortune 100 companies like Aramco and Tracinda; NetJets, casinos like the Las Vegas Sands, but the 2008 recession put ultra large jets under scrutiny and were divested by many companies including The Limited, General Electric, and Occidental Petroleum. Similarly, Xi Jinping's anti-corruption campaign reduced conspicuous consumption of private jets in China.
BBJs are now operated by private firms and individuals: Fresno's Assemi Group, Miami's Crescent Heights, Wichita's Town & Country Food Market, Funair Corp., toymaker Ty Inc., Fortress Transportation & Instructure, Jeffrey Katzenberg, John Travolta, Steven Spielberg, Washington Corp., Tutor Saliba or pachinko king Hideyuki Busujima, with many registrations hiding their owners’ identities.

State VIP users
Most BBJs are operated by governments for VIP transport in U.S., Australia and Africa, plus Colombia, Turkey, India, UAE, Jordan, Malaysia, South Africa and Tunisia; or Middle East oil barons like Abu Dhabi, Dubai and Saudi Arabia royalty.

Orders and deliveries

See also

Notes

References

External links

 

Business Jet
United States business aircraft
Boeing 737
Boeing 747
Boeing 777
Boeing 787 Dreamliner